1965 is the sixth studio album by American rock band The Afghan Whigs. It was released on October 27, 1998, by Columbia Records.

Writing and recording 
The album was written and recorded after Greg Dulli, the band's lead singer and rhythm guitarist, underwent treatment for clinical depression. The Afghan Whigs recorded primarily at Daniel Lanois' Kingsway Studios in New Orleans, with additional recording done at Ocean Way and Larrabee North in Los Angeles, The American Sector in New Orleans, and London Bridge in Seattle. Dulli produced the album and wrote most of its songs. For the cover, a photograph was used showing astronaut Ed White on the first American space walk as part of the Gemini 4 flight which took place in June 1965.

Music and lyrics 
The album incorporates jazz, R&B, and soul music influences in its mainly rock sound. The lyrics feature erotic narratives and paeans to sexuality. Music journalist David Stubbs writes that the album's subject matter "reconciles lust for women with respect for women", abandoning the "ironic self-loathing" of the band's 1993 album Gentlemen (1993) and the "down in the dumps" lyrics of Black Love (1996).

Critical reception 

Reviewing for the Los Angeles Times in November 1998, Marc Weingarten regarded songs like "Somethin' Hot" and "Neglekted" as "the ugliest sort of come-ons, full of innuendo and whispered imprecations", but concluded that "Dulli's velvety vocals and the band's sharp, punchy melodies win you over every time." Entertainment Weekly reviewer Matt Diehl called Dulli "one of rock’s finest lyricists: His noir vignettes read like a Jim Thompson novel, their erotic narratives expertly skewering the male psyche." Stubbs, in NME, hailed 1965 as "a triumph against the grain of post-grunge", while Jason Ankeny of AllMusic called it "the gritty soul record just always out of The Afghan Whigs' reach—seamlessly integrating the R&B aspirations which have textured the band's sound since the beginning".

Some reviewers were less receptive. Robert Christgau assigned 1965 a "neither" grade in Christgau's Consumer Guide: Albums of the '90s (2000), indicating an album that "may impress once or twice with consistent craft or an arresting track or two. Then it won't." In The New Rolling Stone Album Guide (2004), Joe Gross considered the album's upbeat tone and healthier thoughts on sexual relationships to be "a mild letdown from the previous trilogy's relentlessness".

Track listing
All tracks written by Greg Dulli except where noted.

"Somethin' Hot" – 2:58
"Crazy" – 4:04
"Uptown Again" – 3:11
"Sweet Son of a Bitch" – 0:23
"66" – 3:23
"Citi Soleil" – 5:06
"John the Baptist" – 5:34
"The Slide Song" (Dulli, McCollum) – 3:54
"Neglekted" (Dulli, McCollum) – 4:01
"Omertà" (Dulli, McCollum) – 5:40
"The Vampire Lanois" (Dulli, McCollum, Horrigan, Curley) – 3:21

Notes 

“Somethin’ Hot” was used in the 2001 film American Pie 2, but did not appear in the soundtrack.

Personnel 
Credits for 1965 adapted from liner notes.

 The Afghan Whigs – primary artist
 David Bianco – mixing
 Marina Chavez – photography
 Alex Chilton – guest artist, performer
 John Curley – bass, composer, keyboards, performer
 Derek DiCenzo – performer
 George Drakoulias – mixing, performer
 Greg Dulli – composer, guitar, piano, producer, vocals
 Doug Falsetti – performer
 Steve Ferrone – guest artist, performer
 Jessy Green – performer
 Frank Harkins – art direction
 Dave Hillis – engineer, performer
 Michael Horrigan – composer, drums

 Mike Horrigan – drums, performer
 Barbara Hunter – cello
 Donal Logue – performer
 Susan Marshall – performer
 Rick McCollum – guitar, performer
 Rick McCollum – composer
 Steve Myers – performer
 Roderick Paulin – tenor saxophone, arranger
 Jeff Powell – engineer
 Lia Sweet – executive producer
 Samuel Venable – performer
 Howie Weinberg – mastering
 Christa Wells – performer
 Russell White – performer

Charts

References

External links
 1965 at Discogs
Album track listing on the Summer's Kiss website
 

1998 albums
The Afghan Whigs albums
Columbia Records albums
Albums produced by Greg Dulli